Remetea (or colloquially Remete; Hungarian pronunciation: , meaning "Hermit of Gyergyó") is a commune in Harghita County, Romania. It lies in the Székely Land, an ethno-cultural region in eastern Transylvania.

Component villages
The commune is composed of four villages:

History
The villages were part of the Székely Land region of the historical Transylvania province. They belonged to Gyergyószék district until the administrative reform of Transylvania in 1876, when they fell within the Csík County in the Kingdom of Hungary. After the Treaty of Trianon of 1920, they became part of Romania and fell within Ciuc County during the interwar period. In 1940, the second Vienna Award granted the Northern Transylvania to Hungary and the villages were held by Hungary until 1944. After Soviet occupation, the Romanian administration returned and the commune became officially part of Romania in 1947. Between 1952 and 1960, the commune fell within the Magyar Autonomous Region, between 1960 and 1968 the Mureș-Magyar Autonomous Region. In 1968, the province was abolished, and since then, the commune has been part of Harghita County.

Demographics
The commune has an absolute Hungarian (Székely) majority. According to the 2002 census it has a population of 6,316 of which 99.27% or 6,270 are Hungarian.

Natives
Balás Jenő - mining engineer, founder of the Hungarian aluminium industry
Cseres Tibor - writer
Győrffy Antal - actor, theatre director
Molnár Levente - opera singer
Paál Elek- writer, publisher
Puskás Ferenc, P. Hugolin OFM - Franciscan friar, journalist/columnist

External links
The commune's official webportal
www.gyergyoremete.info
Székely Anthem
Village map

References

Communes in Harghita County
Localities in Transylvania
Székely communities